The first USS George Washington was a frigate in the United States Navy. She was named after United States Founding Father and President George Washington.

George Washington was built as a merchant vessel at Providence, R.I., in 1793; purchased by the Congress at Providence 12 October 1798 from John Brown and John Francis for $10,400 in cash and $30,000 in 6 percent navy stock, for use in the developing undeclared naval war (the so-called Quasi-War) with France, and converted to a warship under the supervision of Captain Silas Talbot with Captain Patrick Fletcher in command.

Service
George Washington proceeded in early December to Dominica, in the West Indies, to join Commodore John Barry's squadron for the protection of American commercial against the many French privateer's preying on US shipping and commerce. For the next few months, she convoyed Americas in the West Indies, sailing from St. Christopher's Island to Tobago. During this time, with revenue cutter Pickering, she recaptured two American ships from the French: the brig Fair American 29 April 1799, and the schooner Francis on 1 May 1799.

She departed the Caribbean in mid-1799, arriving Newport, Rhode Island, 12 June 1799, and after a short stay sailed again 2 July. On this cruise, she searched the coast for French privateers as far south as Charleston, S.C., and then took station off Santo Domingo protecting American commerce. The George Washington returned to the United States, in October 1799, for extensive repairs.

She was taken to Philadelphia in April 1800 and there was outfitted and prepared for sea. in May 1800 Captain William Bainbridge was given command of the George Washington.  Lacking a strong navy, the United States accepted the questionable alternative of trying to protect its commerce from the Barbary pirates by paying an annual tribute (extortion). Bainbridge sailed with a load of stores and timber for the Dey of Algiers on 8 August. The George Washington arrived safely in September, the first American warship to enter the Mediterranean.However the ship did not contain enough tribute to satisfy the Dey's demands. The Dey demanded the use of the ship and its crew, claiming he owned them since they pay tribute.  Unhappily, Bainbridge had to accede to threats and carry the Dey's presents to the Sultan at Constantinople. He protested vigorously but, in the face of concentrated guns ashore and credible threats of retaliation against American shipping, he departed 19 October. The George Washington returned to Algiers on 21 January 1801, and after a visit to Alicant arrived back in the United States on 19 April 1801.

The ship underwent repairs and was again fitted to carry stores and timber to Algiers. Manned with only a partial crew, she sailed 20 July 1801 and arrived in Algiers via Málaga, Spain, on 5 October 1801. After calling at Italian and French ports, she returned to Philadelphia about 15 April 1802. George Washington was sold in May 1802 by the Navy agent in Philadelphia, George Harrison.

See also
List of sloops of war of the United States Navy
Bibliography of early American naval history

References

Bibliography
 E'Book
 E'Book E'Book2
 E'Book

Sloops of the United States Navy
Quasi-War ships of the United States
Barbary Wars American ships
1793 ships
Ships named for Founding Fathers of the United States